A Fine Romance may refer to:

 "A Fine Romance" (song), a 1936 popular song written by Jerome Kern and Dorothy Fields
 A Fine Romance (film), a 1991 Italian comedy
 A Fine Romance (1981 TV series), a 1980s British sitcom
 A Fine Romance (1989 TV series), a 1989 American comedy-drama
 A Fine Romance, a 1984 play by William James Royce